Big Spring is a ghost town located in Wayne County, Iowa, USA.

By 1887, several mineral springs had been located nearby.

The settlement had a post office from 1875 to 1901.

All that remains of the settlement is the Big Springs Cemetery.

References

Geography of Wayne County, Iowa
Ghost towns in Iowa
1875 establishments in Iowa